Armandas Kelmelis (born 22 March 1998) is a Lithuanian rower.

In 2016 less than a month before 2016 Summer Olympics started A.Kelmelis was selected to Olympic team due withdrawal of injured Rolandas Maščinskas.

References

1998 births
Living people
Lithuanian male rowers
Sportspeople from Kaunas
Rowers at the 2016 Summer Olympics
Rowers at the 2020 Summer Olympics
Olympic rowers of Lithuania